Deh Shib or Deh-e Shib or Dehshib may refer to:
Deh Shib, Fars
Deh Shib, Fasa, Fars Province
Deh-e Shib, Kuhbanan, Kerman Province
Deh-e Shib, Ravar, Kerman Province
Deh Shib, Razavi Khorasan
Deh Shib, South Khorasan